Drupa elegans is a species of sea snail, a marine gastropod mollusk in the family Muricidae, the murex snails or rock snails.

Description

Distribution

References

 Claremont M., Reid D.G. & Williams S.T. (2012) Speciation and dietary specialization in Drupa, a genus of predatory marine snails (Gastropoda: Muricidae). Zoologica Scripta 41: 137–149

elegans
Gastropods described in 1829